Alfanus, Alphanus or Alfano may refer to:

Alfanus I, physician, archbishop of Salerno (1058–1085)
Alfanus II, archbishop of Salerno (1086–1121)
Alfanus of Camerota, archbishop of Capua (1158–1180)

See also
 Alfano, a village and comune in Salerno, Campania, Italy
 Alfano (surname)

Masculine given names